Edith Jemima Simcox (21 August 1844 –  15 September 1901) was a British writer, trade union activist, a  proto-feminist suffragist. She began her writing career as a reviewer, publishing criticism under the pseudonym "H. Lawrenny," including an important review of the Memoir of Jane Austen (1870). In 1875 she and Emma Paterson became the first women to attend the Trades Union Congress as delegates. In 1872, when she was preparing a book review of Middlemarch, Edith Simcox met and fell in love with the female novelist known by her pseudonym, George Eliot. Although this "love-passion" was not reciprocated, Simcox was determined "to love rather than be loved" and continued to be a devoted friend to Eliot. For Simcox's complete journal, see Fulmer and Barfield, eds., Autobiography of a Shirtmaker. Simcox lived at 60 Dean Street, London. From 1879-1882 she was a member of the London School Board representing Westminster.

Works
Natural Law: An Essay in Ethics (1877)
George Eliot. Her life and works (1881) article in the Nineteenth Century
Episodes in the Lives of Men, Women and Lovers (1882) fiction
The Capacity of Women (1887) article in the Nineteenth Century
Primitive Civilizations: or Outlines of the History of Ownership in Archaic Communities (1894)
A Monument to the Memory of George Eliot: Edith J. Simcox's Autobiography of a Shirtmaker (1998) autobiography, edited by Constance M. Fulmer and Margaret E. Barfield (New York: Routledge, 1997)

References

Further reading 
 K. A. McKenzie (1961) Edith Simcox and George Eliot
 Rosemarie Bodenheimer, 'Autobiography in Fragments: The Elusive Life of Edith Simcox', Victorian Studies 44 (Spring 2002): 399-422

External links

1844 births
1901 deaths
English women writers
English feminist writers
Members of the London School Board
English lesbian writers
19th-century women writers
19th-century English women
19th-century English people